John Stewart Hagestad III (born April 10, 1991) is an American amateur golfer.

Golf career
Hagestad played his college golf for the USC Trojans.

Hagestad won the 2016 U.S. Mid-Amateur at Stonewall, in Elverson, Pennsylvania, earning a spot at the 2017 Masters Tournament. He became the first U.S. Mid-Amateur champion qualifier to make the cut at the Masters (Jay Sigel was 1987 Mid-Amateur champion and made the cut at the 1988 Masters Tournament, but at the time the Mid-Amateur champion did not receive an invite and Sigel qualified by playing for the United States in the Walker Cup). Hagestad finished in a tie for 36th place, and won the Silver Cup as the lowest-scoring amateur. Despite his performance, he stated that he has no desire to turn professional.

Hagestad also won the 2016 Metropolitan Amateur. He competed in the U.S. Open in 2017, 2018, 2019, and 2022.

Hagestad teamed with Emilia Migliaccio, Brandon Wu, and Rose Zhang to win the mixed team gold medal at the 2019 Pan American Games. He finished 13th in the men's individual competition.

Hagestad claimed a second U.S. Mid-Amateur title in 2021.

Professional career
Hagestad worked at a real estate firm in New York City.

Amateur wins
2009 Scott Robertson Memorial (Boys 15–18)
2016 Metropolitan Amateur, U.S. Mid-Amateur
2021 George C Thomas Invitational – Mid-Amateur, U.S. Mid-Amateur

Source:

Results in major championships

LA = Low amateur
CUT = missed the half-way cut
"T" = tied for place
NT = No tournament due to COVID-19 pandemic

U.S. national team appearances
Amateur
Walker Cup: 2017 (winners), 2019 (winners), 2021 (winners)

References

American male golfers
Amateur golfers
USC Trojans men's golfers
Pan American Games medalists in golf
Pan American Games gold medalists for the United States
Golfers at the 2019 Pan American Games
Medalists at the 2019 Pan American Games
Golfers from California
Sportspeople from Newport Beach, California
1991 births
Living people